Secrets and Wives was an American reality documentary television series that premiered on June 2, 2015, on Bravo. The series was greenlit by Bravo in July 2014. The docu-series chronicles the life of six women who all grew up on Long Island and follows them as they go through the challenges of marriage and divorce. The women are described as a "tight-knit, ultra-wealthy group of friends and rivals who know everything about each other."

The series may resemble the series The Real Housewives aired on the same network. One of the cast members, Andi Black, explains the difference by saying that "we've [the cast] all known each other for 20 to 30 years." She emphasizes the fact that they are all long-time girlfriends and have always been involved in each other's life. "When the camera stops rolling, we're still talking about the same issue," she also added.

The show was not renewed for a second season.

Cast 
 Andi Black
 Susan Doneson
 Cori Goldfarb
 Gail Greenberg
 Amy Miller
 Liza Sandler

Episodes

Broadcast
Internationally, the series premiered in Australia on September 8, 2015 on Arena.

Reception 
Verne Gay from Newsday wrote a negative review about the show by saying that "the ladies seem like fun, the show not so much."

References

External links 

 
 
 

2010s American reality television series
2015 American television series debuts
2015 American television series endings
English-language television shows
Bravo (American TV network) original programming